Antonietta Baistrocchi (4 July 1955 – 8 June 1994) was an Italian basketball player. She competed in the women's tournament at the 1980 Summer Olympics.

References

1955 births
1994 deaths
Italian women's basketball players
Olympic basketball players of Italy
Basketball players at the 1980 Summer Olympics
Basketball players from Rome
20th-century Italian women